Irving Kolodin (February 21, 1908April 29, 1988) was an American music critic and music historian.

Biography
Irving Kolodin was born in New York City, New York. He wrote for the New York Sun from 1932 to 1950 and for the Saturday Review starting in 1947. He was best known for his popular Guide to Recorded Music.  He also wrote program notes for the New York Philharmonic and Metropolitan Opera, and a 762-page "candid history" of the Met up to 1966. He was married to Irma (née Levy) Zeckendorf, former wife of real estate developer William Zeckendorf.

References

Grammy Award winners
Opera critics
American music critics
1908 births
1988 deaths
Metropolitan Opera people
American music historians
20th-century American historians
The New York Sun people
20th-century American male writers
American male non-fiction writers
Historians from New York (state)